Paandi Nattu Thangam is a 1989 Indian Tamil-language romantic drama film directed by T. P. Gajendran. The film stars Karthik and Nirosha. It was released on 19 May 1989, and was one of the biggest hits of Karthik in the 1980s.

Plot 

Thangapandian, an honest forest officer, is transferred to a village. The village chief cuts illegally the sandalwood trees. Radha is brought up by her adoptive family. When she was young, her father, a famous singer, died in a car accident. Thangapandian falls in love with Radha.

Cast 
Karthik as Thangapandian
Nirosha as Radha
M. N. Nambiar as Captain Raghu, Thangapandian's father
Senthamari as Village Chief
Babloo Prithviraj as ravi
S. S. Chandran as Senthil Brother
Senthil as Vinayagam
Kovai Sarala as Venkatasubbama (Chuppu)
Sangili Murugan as Munsif
V Gopalakrishnan as Inspector
Sattam Pillai Venkatraman
Usilai Mani
Peeli Sivam
Kullamani
Baby Manju as Durga

Soundtrack 
The film score and the soundtrack were composed by Ilaiyaraaja, with lyrics written by Gangai Amaran.

References

External links 

1980s Tamil-language films
1989 films
1989 romantic drama films
Films directed by T. P. Gajendran
Films scored by Ilaiyaraaja
Indian romantic drama films